Fred J. Rath (October 15, 1888 – April 9, 1968) was an American businessman and politician from New York.

Life
He was born on October 15, 1888, in Utica, Oneida County, New York. He attended the public schools. Then he worked as a chauffeur, a car salesman, and as manager, and later owner, of an automobile repair shop. He married Louise, who was a court stenographer from 1913 to 1958, but they had no children.

He was Mayor of Utica in 1929; and a member of the New York State Senate from 1951 to 1964, sitting in the 168th, 169th, 170th, 171st, 172nd, 173rd and 174th New York State Legislatures.

He died on April 9, 1968, in St. Elizabeth Hospital in Utica, New York, after a long illness.

Sources

1888 births
1968 deaths
Politicians from Utica, New York
Republican Party New York (state) state senators
20th-century American politicians
Businesspeople from Utica, New York
20th-century American businesspeople